NGC 95 is a spiral galaxy located in the Pisces constellation. It was discovered by English astronomer John Fredrick William Herschel on October 18, 1784. The galaxy has several blue spiral arms surrounding a bright yellow nucleus, and is approximately 120,000 light years in diameter, making it only slightly larger than the Milky Way.

References

External links
 
 

0095
Intermediate spiral galaxies
Pisces (constellation)
00214
001426
Astronomical objects discovered in 1784
Discoveries by John Herschel